Kurt Küttner (1907 – 1964) was an SS-Oberscharführer (Staff Sergeant) who served at Treblinka extermination camp, arrested and charged with war crimes at the Treblinka trials twenty years after the war ended.

Career
Before World War II, Kurt (Fritz) Küttner worked for many years as a warden in the German police. During Operation Reinhard in occupied Poland he was in charge of the lower camp of Treblinka II Totenlager, where he became one of the most feared and hated SS officers.  He would follow people around, stop them and search for money, pictures or any family mementos that the prisoners would try to hide on their person.  If he caught someone carrying anything, he would beat the prisoner cruelly and send him to the Lazarett, or infirmary, where the prisoner was killed.  In his capacity as commander of the Lower Camp and over the Jewish prisoners, he wanted to know exactly what was going on throughout his jurisdiction.  He therefore exploited the weakness or baseness of some of the prisoners and turned them into informers.  He received the nickname "Kiwe" from the prisoners.

Küttner ordered the worker Jews (Arbeitskommando) who worked in the Lazarett of his lower camp to wear armbands bearing the red cross emblem, so as to deceive the true nature of the "infirmary" as a killing station.

As recalled by SS-Unterscharführer (Corporal) Franz Suchomel:

Küttner was also in charge of whipping prisoners at the evening roll call.  Samuel Willenberg, one of the prisoners at Treblinka, recounts how this went:

After Operation Reinhard ended Küttner also  served in the SS in Italy. After the war, Küttner, along with ten other former SS officers from Treblinka, was arrested and charged at the Treblinka trials, but he died in 1964 before the trial began.

References

1907 births
1964 deaths
German police officers
SS non-commissioned officers
Treblinka extermination camp personnel
Treblinka trials